Alfonso Angelini (1918–1995) was an Italian professional golfer and instructor after World War II.

Angelini was runner-up at the Italian Open in 1950 (lost playoff to Ugo Grappasonni), 1952, 1958 and 1959. He won his first international tournament when he beat Gerard de Wit in the playoff at the Dutch Open in 1955. He also won the Swiss Open in 1957 and 1966 and the Portuguese Open in 1962 and 1966. In 1968 he played the World Cup in Rome with Roberto Bernardini, finishing third behind Canada and the United States. He played The Open Championship six times, finishing 12th in 1954.

Angelini lost to Ken Bousfield in a playoff for the 1972 PGA Seniors Championship at Longniddry, Scotland. He took a bogey 5 at the first extra hole to Bousfield's par 4.

Angelini and Grappasonni were teaching pros at the Golf Club Villa d'Este. Together with Aldo Casera they founded the Professional Golfer's Association of Italy in 1962. The three men were known as the "three musketeers".

Professional wins
this list may be incomplete
1945 Rome Open
1947 Italian Native Open
1951 Italian Native Open
1952 Italian Native Open
1953 Italian Native Open
1955 Dutch Open
1957 Swiss Open
1958 Italian Native Open
1959 Italian Native Open
1961 Italian Native Open
1962 Portuguese Open, Italian Native Open
1964 Italian Native Open
1965 Italian Native Open
1966 Swiss Open, Portuguese Open
1968 Lancia d'Oro
1969 Italian Native Open
1970 Lancia d'Oro

Results in major championships

Note: Angelini never played in the U.S. Open nor the PGA Championship.

CUT = missed the half-way cut
"T" indicates a tie for a place

Team appearances
Continental Europe–United States: (representing Continental Europe): 1953
Joy Cup: (representing the Rest of Europe): 1954, 1955, 1958
World Cup (representing Italy): 1955, 1956, 1957, 1958, 1959, 1960, 1961, 1962, 1963, 1964, 1965, 1968, 1969

References

Italian male golfers
1918 births
1995 deaths